Eleanor James (born 18 April 1986 in Shrewsbury, Shropshire) is an English actress.

Career
In 2005 Eleanor landed her first film role when she got the part of a fallen angel in Demonic, starring Tom Savini. Eleanor then got the role of Josephine Stewart in comedy/horror Hellbride and in 2007 played the supporting role of Anna in Italian horror film Colour from the Dark directed by Ivan Zuccon, starring Debbie Rochon. In 2008 she played the role of Stitchgirl in Alan Ronald's segment of British horror anthology Bordello Death Tales. Eleanor then took the lead role in German zombie film Unrated directed by Timo Rose and Andreas Schnaas. The low-budget film was shot in Goslar in summer 2009.

Filmography
 Forest of the Damned (2004) (US title: Johannes Roberts' Demonic)
 Transformed - ITV Ident (2004)
 The Design (2005)
 Cherry Orchard (2005)
 An American Nobody in London (2005)
 Martyr (2006)
 Jam (2006)
 Poland Night (2006)
 Dr. Psycho's Chamber of Sadism 1: Sado-Nurses in Heat (2006)
 Hellbride (2007)
 MoonGal & The Planet Of The She Vixens (2007)
 MoonGal & The Emerald Of Yesterday (2007)
 The Devil's Music (2008)
 ZoTN (2008)
 Colour from the Dark (2008)
 Webkam (2008)
 Bordello Death Tales (2009)
 Braincell (2009)
 Unrated (2009)
 Zombies of the Night (2009)
 Till Sunset (2010)
 Dead Cert (2010)
 Karl the Butcher vs Axe (2010)
 Maximum Shame (2010)
 Harolds Going Stiff (2010)
 Backslasher (2010)
 Monitor (2010)
 Slasher House (2012)
 Le Sequel (2016)
 Forest of the Damned 2 (2017)

Music videos
 2005: Secret Agent - Esoterica
 2005: Nurse - The Research
 2004: Jason Nevins - 'Main Man'
 2004: Boogie Pimps - Sunny

References

External links
 Official Site
 
 Official MySpace

1986 births
Living people
Actors from Shrewsbury
English film actresses